Alice Carter Cook (April 8, 1868 – June 14, 1943), (born Alice Carter), was an American botanist and author whose plant collections are now held by the Smithsonian Institution and the Academy of Natural Sciences of Philadelphia.

Cook was the first woman to receive a PhD in botany from an American university.

Biography 
Carter was born in New York City on April 8, 1868 to Samuel Thompson Carter and Alantha Carter (née Pratt). Her father was a clergyman in Huntington, New York. 

Carter studied at Mount Holyoke Seminary before enrolling at Syracuse University for her doctorate.   She graduated in 1888, receiving the first doctorate in botany for a woman from an American University.

Carter taught at Mount Holyoke for three years before attending Cornell University where she earned an M.S. in botany, in 1892. That same year, she married botanist Orator Fuller Cook.  The couple later traveled on  expeditions to Africa and the Canary Islands.

Cook worked with botanist Henrietta Hooker.  Cook had two sons and two daughters; her son Robert Carter Cook became a geneticist and demographer.

Cook died on June 14, 1943.  Her plant collections were donated to the Smithsonian Institution and the Academy of Natural Sciences.

Publications 
In addition to botanical publications, Cook contributed several articles to Popular Science Monthly and Ladies' Home Journal. .

Cook also wrote an anthropological profile of the indigenous native people of the Canary Islands, and published poems, short stories, and two plays.

References

External links

 
 Alice Carter Cook Field Notes, 1893-1897 in the Smithsonian Institution Archives
 Cook, Alice. Index of Botanists. Harvard University Herbaria
 Cook, Alice Carter. Global Plants, JSTOR

1868 births
1943 deaths
American botanists
Syracuse University alumni
Cornell University College of Agriculture and Life Sciences alumni
American women botanists
Botanists active in Africa
People from Lanham, Maryland
Scientists from New York City
Mount Holyoke College alumni
Mount Holyoke College faculty
American women academics